The South Australian Railways M class (second) was a group of twenty 2-4-2T engines sold to the SAR by the Victorian Railways for $3,300 each between June 1920 to October 1922. The class was formerly the Victorian Railways' E class.

M2
2-4-2T locomotives
Broad gauge locomotives in Australia
Scrapped locomotives